1995 Gamba Osaka season

Review and events

League results summary

League results by round

Competitions

Domestic results

J.League

Emperor's Cup

Player statistics

 † player(s) joined the team after the opening of this season.

Transfers

In:

Out:

Transfers during the season

In

Out
 Masahiro Wada (to Vissel Kobe)
 Akira Kubota (to Kyoto Purple Sanga)

Awards
none

References

Other pages
 J. League official site
 Gamba Osaka official site

Gamba Osaka
Gamba Osaka seasons